Darin Lewis (born 28 April 1976) is a Trinidadian soccer player who plays for WASA FC.

Youth
The son of former Trinidad and Tobago national football captain Steve Pierre, Lewis attended Mercer County Community College where he was part of Mercer's 1997 and 1998 JUCO soccer championship teams.  In 1999, he transferred to the University of Connecticut where he played on the men's soccer team in 1999 and 2000.  In 2000, the Huskies won the NCAA Men's Division I Soccer Championship and Lewis was a Second Team All American.

Professional
In June 2001, he signed with the Portland Timbers of the USL A-League.  On 1 April 2002, he joined the MetroStars as one of three allowed foreign players.  He played three games, one start before going down injured.  A week later, a multi-player trade brought in two more foreign players and the MetroStars released Lewis.

References

External links
 Player profile at MetroFanatic.com
 MLS: Darin Lewis

1976 births
Living people
Trinidad and Tobago footballers
UConn Huskies men's soccer players
USL First Division players
Portland Timbers (2001–2010) players
Virginia Beach Mariners players
New York Red Bulls players
Major League Soccer players
People from Tunapuna–Piarco
MCCC Vikings men's soccer players
Association football forwards
NCAA Division I Men's Soccer Tournament Most Outstanding Player winners